Areg Elibekyan (born June 29, 1970) is an Armenian painter.

Biography
Areg Elibekyan was born in Yerevan, Armenia, the son of Robert Elibekyan. From 1987 to 1992, he studied at the Yerevan Arts and Theatre Institute, but has lived in Montreal since 1992.

His work has been exhibited in Armenia, France, Lebanon, Canada, and the United States and displayed at the Modern Art Museum of Yerevan, Alex & Marie Manoogian Museum of Detroit, and the Arame Art Gallery, Yerevan, Armenia.

Since 2009, Elibekyan has been an art instructor at the Montreal Museum of Fine Arts.

Public Collections
 Modern Art Museum (Yerevan, Armenia)
 Alex and Marie Manoogian Museum (Southfield, Michigan, United States)
 City of Le Vésin (France)
 City of Lethbridge (Alberta, Canada)
 Musée des maitres et artisans du Québec (Montréal, Québec, Canada)
 Arrondissement de St-Laurent (Montréal, Québec, Canada)

Personal Exhibitions 
2016 Arame Art Gallery, Yerevan
2016 Stewart Hall, Pointe-Claire, Quebec, Canada
2014 Espace Laoun, Montreal, Quebec, Canada
 2013 Galeria Cervantes Cabrera, Havana, Cuba
 2011 Centre National de l'Esthetique, Erevan, Armenie
 2011 Galerie Exib Art, Montreal, Quebec, Canada
 2010 Centre National de l'Esthetique, Erevan, Armenie
 2010 Festival Internacional de l'Art, Holguin, Cuba
 2008 Galerie Arte Bella, Montreal, Quebec, Canada
 2007 Gallery Z., Providence, R. I., USA
 2005 Association Hamazkain culturel de Montreal, QC
 2004 Galerie Klimantiris, Montreal, Quebec, Canada
2002 Galerie Klimantiris, Montreal, Quebec, Canada
2001 Karen Mitchell Frank Gallery, Dallas, USA
2000 Galerie Soleil, Montreal, Quebec, Canada
1999 Noah's Ark Gallery, Beirut, Lebanon 
1999 Centre de Loisir de Saint-LAurent, QC
1998 Galerie Hai Cie, Paris, France
1998 Galerie 22, Antwerpen, Belgium
1997 Galerie L'Oeil, Brussels, Belgium
1993 Municipal Library, Ville Saint-Laurent, Quebec, Canada

Group exhibitions 
2013 "Sensual Revelations", Beirut, Lebanon
2013 "X eme Salon yonnals des Artistes Armenien", Lyon, France
2013 Exposition de la famille Elibekian, Gallery Z., Peovidence R. I.
2012 "Arts & Jazz Sspring Fest", Philadelphia, PA 
2006, 2009, 2011 Gallery Z, Providence, USA
2008 Museé des Maîtres et Artisans du Québec
2005 Alex and Marie Manougian Museum, Michigan Souhfield, MI
2005 Tekeian Cultural Association  Pasadena, USA
2005 Daniel Besseiche Gallery,	Paris, France
2004 Gallery Jacqueline Lemoine, Paris, France
1997 Armenian Library and Museum of America, Boston, USA
1997 Native Gallery, Providence, USA
1994 Exposition "Petit Format", Galerie Michelange, Montréal, QC
1993 Galerie Soldarco, Montréal, Quebec, Canada
1992 Centre International des Arts, Beirut, Lebanon

Family 

Elibekyan is the grandson of Vagharshak Elibekyan, an Honored Artist of Georgia, and the son of Robert Elibekyan, an Honored Art Worker and People's Artist of Armenia.

See also
List of Armenian artists
List of Armenians
Culture of Armenia

Books
Areg Elibekian, Studio Elibekian, Quebec, 2005.
Areg Elibekian, Céline Le Merlus, Tigran Mets, Yerevan, 2016.

References

External links
 Areg Elibekyan

1970 births
Artists from Yerevan
Living people
20th-century Armenian painters
21st-century Armenian painters